Shell Danielson (born September 25, 1962, in Upland, California) is an American actress and writer. She was the  third actress to play the role of Laken Lockridge on the NBC soap opera Santa Barbara. She played the role from 1990 to 1991.

Danielson also worked on children's action/adventure series Power Rangers. She joined the cast of the ABC soap General Hospital as the second Dominique Baldwin and played the role until 1993. She also had a short recurring role as Bunny Hutchinson on The Young and the Restless in 2001.

Acting credits

Television
 Santa Barbara (1990-1991): Laken Lockridge
 General Hospital (1991-1993): Dominique Stanton
 Bodies of Evidence (1992): Jessica Morton
 Baywatch (1994): Annie
 Mighty Morphin Power Rangers (1996): Reporter
 Port Charles (1997-1999): Dominique Stanton
 The Young and the Restless (2001): Bunny Hutchinson

Film
 Blindfold: Acts of Obsession (1994): Young Female Addict
 Someone to Die For (1995): Lydia Kellerman
 Casper: A Spirited Beginning (1997): Newscaster

Screenwriting credits

Television
 Sweet Valley High (1994)
 Mighty Morphin Power Rangers (1994-1995)
 Masked Rider (1995)
 Power Rangers Zeo (1996)
 Big Bad Beetleborgs (1996)
 Power Rangers Turbo (1997)

Film
 Someone to Die For (1995)
 Turbo: A Power Rangers Movie (1997)
 Exception to the Rule (1997)
 Rusty: A Dog’s Tale (1998)

External links
 
 Biography of Shell Danielson

American television actresses
American soap opera actresses
American women writers
Living people
1962 births
21st-century American women